Equality march may refer to:
National Equality March, 2009 LGBT rights march in the United States
National Pride March (also known as Equality March for Unity and Pride), 2017 LGBT rights march in the United States
Equality marches in Poland, Polish equivalent of LGBT pride parades
March for Equality and Against Racism, 1983 French anti-racism rally